is a 2017 Japanese romantic comedy-drama film based on the manga series of the same name by Miwa Ueda, produced by Fine Entertainment and distributed by Shochiku. The film was directed by Kōji Shintoku, written by Junpei Yamaoka, and stars Mizuki Yamamoto, Kei Inoo, Mackenyu, Mei Nagano, Yuika Motokariya, Kensei Mikami, Takeshi Masu and Momoko Kikuchi. It was released in Japan by Shochiku on 20 May 2017. The theme song for this film is "Call Me Maybe" by Carly Rae Jepsen. On April 1, 2017, the creator Ueda stated that she has drawn the manga version of the posters then.

Plot
Momo Adachi (Mizuki Yamamoto) is a female high school student, always at a loss because she's mistaken as an “easy bimbo girl” due to her appearance. Furthermore, somehow a rumor spreads that she had kissed the most popular boy in her grade, Kairi Okayasu (Kei Inoo) and she has to deal with being the target of harassment by other girls who like him. But ever since junior high school, Momo has actually been fond of a boy called Toji. He gives his all to the baseball club, and although Momo can watch Toji from a distance, she is never able to reveal her feelings.

Cast
Mizuki Yamamoto as Momo Adachi
Kei Inoo as Kairi Okayasu
Mackenyu as Kazuya Tojigamori
Mei Nagano as Sae Kashiwagi
Yuika Motokariya as Misao Aki
Kensei Mikami as Ryo Okayasu
Takeshi Masu as Takashi Okayasu
Momoko Kikuchi as Sakurako Adachi
Daisuke Kikuta as Goro Ooji / Jigoro

Reception
The film was third place on its opening weekend in Japan, earning US$1.29 million.

References

External links
Official website (Japanese)

Live-action films based on manga
Japanese romantic comedy-drama films
2017 romantic comedy-drama films
2010s Japanese films
2010s Japanese-language films